Sialic acid synthase is an enzyme that in humans is encoded by the NANS gene.

This gene encodes an enzyme that functions in the biosynthetic pathways of sialic acids. In vitro, the encoded protein uses N-acetylmannosamine 6-phosphate and mannose 6-phosphate as substrates to generate phosphorylated forms of N-acetylneuraminic acid (Neu5Ac) and 2-keto-3-deoxy-D-glycero-D-galacto-nononic acid (KDN), respectively. However, it exhibits much higher activity toward the Neu5Ac phosphate product. 
In insect cells, expression of this gene results in Neu5Ac and KDN production. This gene is related to the E. coli sialic acid synthase gene neuB, and it can partially restore sialic acid synthase activity in an E. coli neuB-negative mutant.

References

Further reading

Human proteins